A car bomb exploded inside the French embassy compound in Beirut on the morning of 24 May 1982. It killed ten Lebanese people and two French people; it wounded 27 other people.

Background 
A series of attacks affected French interests in Lebanon during the civil war. On September 4, 1981, French Ambassador Louis Delamare was assassinated. On April 15, 1982, Guy Cavallo, encryptor at the embassy was also killed. On April 22, the attack on Rue Marbeuf in Paris took place targeting a Lebanese journalist. Two days later a rocket attack targeted AFP premises in Beirut.

Attack 
The Renault 12 of Anna Cosmidis, secretary of the embassy's economic service, exploded when the secretary entered the embassy gate on Monday, 24 May at 8:10 a.m. The bomb killed Anna Cosmidis and four other staff members, a paratrooper as well as a plumber and two ushers. The other victims were people queuing in front of the diplomatic representation. In total, the casualties were 11 dead and 27 injured.

References

1982 in international relations
1982 bombing
1982 murders in Lebanon
20th-century mass murder in Lebanon
Attacks on buildings and structures in 1982
1982 bombing
Attacks on diplomatic missions in Lebanon
Attacks on diplomatic missions of France
Car and truck bombings in Lebanon
Improvised explosive device bombings in 1982
1982
Mass murder in 1982
1982 bombing
May 1982 crimes
May 1982 events in Asia
Terrorist incidents in Lebanon in 1982
Building bombings in Lebanon